Rachel Bissex (December 27, 1956 – February 20, 2005) was an American folk singer-songwriter. Her works included "Dancing With My Mother" and "Drive All Night".

Death
Bissex died in 2005, aged 48, in Burlington, Vermont from breast cancer.

Legacy
Rachel Bissex Memorial College Fund

Discography
 Light in Dark Places (1991)
 Don't Look Down (1995)
 I Used to Be Nice (1998)
 Between the Broken Lines (2001)
 In White Light (2004)
 Tribute-CD: Remembering Rachel. Songs of Rachel Bissex (2005)

References

External links

 Victor K. Heyman's Porträt of "Rachel Bissex" 
 Interview on Vermont PBS "Profile" 11/5/2004
 Tribute CD
 Biography

1956 births
2005 deaths
American blues singers
American folk singers
Deaths from cancer in Vermont
Deaths from breast cancer
20th-century American singers
People from Boston
Musicians from Boston
20th-century American women singers
21st-century American women